Clinton (or Ka-dah-wis-dag, "white field" in Seneca language) is a village in Oneida County, New York, United States. The population was 1,942 at the 2010 census, declining to 1,683 in the 2020 census 13% decline). It was named for George Clinton, the first Governor of New York.

The Village of Clinton, site of Hamilton College, is within the Town of Kirkland. The village was known as the "village of schools" due to the large number of private schools operating in the village during the 19th century.

History 

Part of Coxe's Patent, 6th division, Clinton began in March 1787 when Revolutionary War veterans from Plymouth, Connecticut, settled in Clinton. Pioneer brought seven other families with him to the area. The new inhabitants found good soil, plentiful forests, and friendly Ben Topi in southern Kirkland along with Oneida people, who passed through on trails.
Named after New York's first governor, George Clinton, an uncle of Erie Canal builder and governor DeWitt Clinton, the village had a gristmill on the Oriskany Creek on College Street the first year and slowly developed as a farming and mercantile center.

In 1793, Presbyterian minister Rev. Samuel Kirkland founded Hamilton-Oneida Academy as a seminary to serve as part of his missionary work with the Oneida tribe. The seminary admitted both white and Oneida boys. Kirkland named it in honor of Treasury Secretary Alexander Hamilton, who was a member of the first Board of Trustees of the Hamilton-Oneida Academy. The Academy became Hamilton College in 1812, making it the third oldest college in New York after Columbia and Union, after it expanded to a four-year college curriculum.

Originally in the Town of Whitestown and then the Town of Paris, Clinton became part of the newly formed Town of Kirkland in 1827, and became an incorporated village in April 1843 with its own board of trustees, officials, employees, and status as a taxing jurisdiction.

Elihu Root, Secretary of State under President McKinley and Secretary of War under presidents McKinley and Roosevelt, was born in a building on the Hamilton College campus, and is probably Clinton's most famous son.

Although never a factory town, Clinton did have the Clinton Knitting Company on the site of the Clinton House Apartments on Kirkland Avenue in the first half of the 20th century, as well as the Clinton Canning Company to process local vegetables in the late summer and fall.

The pharmaceutical company Bristol-Myers Squibb began as the Clinton Pharmaceutical Company in 1887 on the second floor over the current CVS drug store at 3-5 West Park Row and moved to Syracuse after three years. Both founders, William Bristol and John Myers, graduated from Hamilton College.

Notable people
 Natalie Babbitt, award-winning children's author
 Clara Barton, founder of American Red Cross.
 Frederick Bee, builder of telegraph over Sierra Nevada mountains and Consul of the Chinese Consulate in San Francisco
 Susan Bennett, American voice-over artist best known for being the female American voice of Apple's "Siri"
 William McLaren Bristol, co-founder of Bristol-Meyers Squibb.
 Jack Britton, former World Welterweight Champion in boxing known as the 'Boxing Marvel'
 Terry Brooks, fantasy author, graduated from Hamilton College
 Grover Cleveland, brief childhood resident.
 Flick Colby, choreographer.
 Edward P. Felt, passenger United Flight 93, died September 11, 2001.
 Ulysses S. Grant III, United States Army officer, grandson of President Ulysses S. Grant.
 Alex Haley, American writer.
 George Hastings, US Congressman, 1853-1857
 Samuel Kirkland, a missionary among the Oneida, obtained a charter for Hamilton College in 1812.
 Mary Lyon, pioneer of women's education.
 Sarah J. Maas, author of Throne of Glass series of fantasy novels, graduated from Hamilton College.
 John Ripley Myers, co-founder of Bristol-Meyers Squibb.
 Joe Nolan, ice hockey defenceman for the Clinton Comets in the 1950s.
 Nick Palmieri, professional ice hockey player, was born in Clinton.
 Christian Heinrich Friedrich Peters, Danish-born astronomer worked at Litchfield Observatory, Hamilton College.
 Ezra Pound, poet and intellectual; attended Hamilton College
 Elihu Root, born in Clinton and attended Hamilton College.
 Eli Parsons Royce, born in this town and was the founder of Escanaba, Michigan.
 B. F. Skinner, psychologist and social philosopher, graduated from Hamilton College.
 Gerrit Smith, congressman 1853-1854, presidential candidate, valedictorian of the first graduating class at Hamilton College.
 Leland Stanford, Governor and Senator of California, founder of Stanford University, studied in Clinton.
 De Wayne Stebbins, Wisconsin State Senator from 1895 to 1903, was born in Clinton.
 Hildegarde Swift, award-winning children's author, was born in Clinton.

Attractions 

The Clinton High School, Middle School, and Elementary School are located towards the center of the village, as are the business offices for the district.

The village centers around the Village Green, a park where many community events take place.  Annual events on and around the Village Green include a summer farmers market, the Shopper's Stroll during the weekend after Thanksgiving, and the Clinton Art and Music festival in August. The Kirkland Art Center also hosts many activities throughout the year, including the KAC Road Race. The historic Clinton Cider Mill, a local favorite on Elm Street, has been producing cider since the early 1900s and is open seasonally from Labor Day through Thanksgiving.

The Clinton Historic District is listed on the National Register of Historic Places. There is also an active Clinton Historical Society.

Former schools in Clinton 
The Clinton Liberal Institute was a coeducational preparatory school founded by the Universalist Church, operating at the corner of Utica and Mulberry Streets from 1831 to 1878, and then in Fort Plain until destroyed by fire in 1900.

Sports 
The Clinton Arena was home to the Clinton Comets of the Eastern Hockey League, which ended play at the arena in 1973. Portions of the movie Slap Shot were filmed at the famed Clinton Arena. The Clinton High School hockey program is widely regarded as one of the best in New York State, despite the small size of the school. The team won back-to-back state championships twice, in 1994-1995 and 1995–1996 and again in 2004-2005 and 2005–2006.

In 2005 and 2006, Clinton's Cross Country team won back-to-back scholar athlete state championships.

In 1984, Clinton's football team went to the Carrier Dome beating V.V.S. in the semi-final, 3-0 and became Section 3 Class B Co-Champion along with Bishop Grimes since the game ended in a tie, 0-0.

Clinton's boys' soccer program won their first Section III title in 2006, and a second in 2011, for the first time advancing to the state semi-finals, as well as an undefeated regular season.  It is also noted that they are among the top contenders for the Center-State Conference Championship every year.
Clinton Track and Field is also well known in the area.

Geography
Clinton is located at  (43.048852, -75.380250).

The village is east of the Oriskany Creek.

Demographics

As of the census of 2000, there were 1,952 people, 922 households, and 488 families residing in the village. The population density was 3,349.4 people per square mile (1,299.4/km2). There were 965 housing units at an average density of 1,655.8 per square mile (642.4/km2). The racial makeup of the village was 98.05% White, 0.61% African American, 0.72% Asian, 0.26% from other races, and 0.36% from two or more races. Hispanic or Latino of any race were 1.33% of the population.

There were 922 households, out of which 25.7% had children under the age of 18 living with them, 43.8% were married couples living together, 6.8% had a female householder with no husband present, and 47.0% were non-families. 41.6% of all households were made up of individuals, and 20.5% had someone living alone who was 65 years of age or older. The average household size was 2.11 and the average family size was 2.94.

In the village, the population was spread out, with 22.7% under the age of 18, 7.4% from 18 to 24, 23.0% from 25 to 44, 27.4% from 45 to 64, and 19.5% who were 65 years of age or older. The median age was 43 years. For every 100 females, there were 88.8 males. For every 100 females age 18 and over, there were 82.8 males. For every 1 person there were about 27.521 other people. Do not ask how there can be 27.521, there just can be, okay?

The median income for a household in the village was $41,958, and the median income for a family was $66,685. Males had a median income of $45,750 versus $31,369 for females. The per capita income for the village was $26,165. About 3.1% of families and 9.7% of the population were below the poverty line, including 4.7% of those under age 18 and 12.2% of those age 65 or over.

References

External links

 Village of Clinton. NY
 Clinton Historical Society
 Clinton Central School District

Villages in New York (state)
Utica–Rome metropolitan area
Populated places established in 1787
Villages in Oneida County, New York
Clinton (village), New York